Harmony is an unincorporated community within Rocky View County in the Canadian province of Alberta.

History 
Harmony received planning approval through the adoption of a conceptual scheme by Rocky View County in February 2007, with a neighbourhood plan for the first stage of Harmony subsequently approved in October 2008. In mid-2012, it was anticipated that it would take 15 years to build out the community. Despite its prior planning approvals, the application for the first stage of subdivision in 2012 was met with local resistance. Concerns were expressed by the Springbank Airport Business and Pilots Association over the long-term incompatibility of the community with the pre-existing airport. Specific concerns included safety as well as speculation that future residents would complain about the noise associated with the airport's operations. Other local stakeholders expressed concerns about the impacts Harmony would have on the existing rural community and the loss of farmland. Rocky View County Council approved the subdivision application for the first stage of the community in early July 2012. The community welcomed its first family in 2016. Within two years, it grew to a population of 249.

Demographics 

Harmony recorded a population of 249 in Rocky View County's 2018 municipal census.

Attractions 
Planned amenities in Harmony include a regional park, playfields, greenbelts, a golf course and a recreational lake.

References 

Designated places in Alberta
Rocky View County
Unincorporated communities in Alberta